Clarence Smith (1849 - 10 June 1941) was a British Liberal politician who served as Member of Parliament for Kingston upon Hull East in the 25th Parliament between 1892 and 1895.

Smith was first elected at the 1892 general election.

He was knighted in the 1895 Resignation Honours.

References 

1849 births
1941 deaths
19th-century British politicians
20th-century British politicians
Liberal Party (UK) MPs for English constituencies
Politicians from Kingston upon Hull
UK MPs 1892–1895